Neerajanam is a 1989 Indian Telugu-language romantic drama film directed by Ashok Kumar and starring Vishwas and Saranya. The film's music is composed by O. P. Nayyar.

Cast 
Vishwas as Vijay
Saranya as Jaya
Sarath Babu

Production 
Saranya Ponvannan made her Telugu debut with this film.

Soundtrack 
After a gap of ten years, O. P. Nayyar returned to composing with this film. All the songs from this film were retained in the Hindi remake Mangni (1992).

Reception 
Griddaluru Gopalrao of Zamin Ryot on his review dated 4 August 1989 criticized the film for its poor writing and lackluster direction. Gopalrao, however, praised Saranya's performance.

Awards
Nandi Awards
 Best Music Director - O. P. Nayyar
 Best Supporting Actor - Sarath Babu

References 

Telugu films remade in other languages